Solid Ground (founded in 1974 as the Fremont Public Association) is an anti-poverty and social service organization in Seattle, Washington. Originating in Seattle's Fremont neighborhood and now based in the adjacent Wallingford neighborhood, the organization works to solve poverty and serves clients throughout Seattle, King County and (for some programs) statewide.

Operating on an annual budget of about US$32 million,<ref>"https://s14621.pcdn.co/wp-content/uploads/2022/06/CommunityReport-2021-Solid-Ground-WEB.pdf", Solid Ground, indicates US$32,366,517 budgeted income and $31,854,878 budgeted expenses. Major program areas fall under the headings Housing, Homelessness Prevention, Hunger & Food Resources, Domestic Violence Services, Legal Services, Advocacy, Anti-Racism Initiative, Retired & Senior Volunteer Services and Transportation Services. 

Solid Ground programs include direct provision of services (support of Seattle food banks, housing programs, skills classes, legal aid to obtain or maintain state benefits, etc.), but they also focus on political organizing and systems change work, including lobbying the Washington state government. They also provide senior volunteers to over 80 King County human service organizations.

Statewide Poverty Action Network- A program of Solid Ground

One of Solid Ground's advocacy programs is the Statewide Poverty Action Network. They work to create systemic change to address root causes of poverty. This program was established in 1996, in response to the federal government’s passage of the Personal Responsibility and Work Opportunity Reconciliation Act (PRWORA), or “welfare reform.” Ten leaders from communities of color came together to form the Washington Welfare Reform Coalition, which in 2001 changed its name to the Statewide Poverty Action Network. The change was made to better to represent an expanded focus on poverty issues of statewide significance.

Poverty Action is a leader in statewide issues and maintains a full-time lobby presence in Olympia. With over 7,000 individual members of their network, Poverty Action is among the largest non-profit advocacy groups in Washington state. In addition to political advocacy, Poverty Action also coordinates the "Vote for A Change Campaign"- An award winning program focused on engaging people living with low-incomes, the previously incarcerated and communities of color in electoral politics. Over 100,000 Washingtonians have been reached through "Vote for A Change" Campaigns from 2004-2011.

External links
 Solid Ground, official site
 Statewide Poverty Action Network, official site

Notes

Non-profit organizations based in Seattle
1974 establishments in Washington (state)
Organizations established in 1974
Wallingford, Seattle